EGREM (Empresa de Grabaciones y Ediciones Musicales, Spanish for Enterprise of Recordings and Musical Editions) is the national record label of Cuba. It is headquartered in Centro Habana, where its main record studios (Estudios Areito 101 & 102) operate. It was founded in 1964 after the nationalization of the Cuban music industry, absorbing the assets of Panart. EGREM had a monopoly on music production activities from 1964 until the late 1980s when independent labels reemerged. EGREM's archive comprises "the most extensive catalog of Cuban music in the world".

Since 2002, EGREM has a commercial director, a public relations department and a web site. Although the label had a history of international licensing deals, direct distribution of EGREM's music did not occur until August 2004, when several agreements were made between the label and European record companies. In 2005, the SGAE (Spanish copyright agency) began to distribute online part of EGREM's catalog. On September 15, 2015, Sony Music announced that it would distribute EGREM's recordings internationally.

Sub-labels
Until 1996, EGREM distributed music recorded at its Havana studios under the imprint Areito. Between the early 1980s and 1996, music from its Santiago de Cuba studios were released under the imprint Siboney.

During the mid to late 1960s, the international distribution of Areito LPs and EPs was handled by Palma, a short-lived imprint organized by EGREM. In the 1970s, Palma was replaced by Guamá, an imprint launched by EGREM to commercialize Cuban music around the world.

EGREM also manages live venues throughout Cuba under the name Casa de la Música.

Roster
Since its foundation EGREM has recorded the vast majority of artists that remained in the island. Many others, such as Celia Cruz, Bebo Valdés and Cachao, went into exile. Starting in the late 1990s, EGREM runs an agency called Musicuba to manage its artists in Havana. A second agency called Son de Cuba operates since 2012 in Santiago de Cuba.

The following artists have recorded material released by EGREM:

Algo Nuevo
Juan Almeida
Pacho Alonso
Adalberto Álvarez y su Son
Paulina Álvarez
Orquesta Aragón
Carlos Averhoff
Guillermo Barreto
Bola de Nieve
Lino Borges
Esther Borja
Los Bucaneros
Elena Burke
Barbarito Díez
Felipe Dulzaides y Los Armónicos
Hilario Durán
Rembert Egües
Estrellas de Areito
Los Fakires
Roberto Faz
Frank Fernández
Joseíto Fernández
Frank Emilio Flynn
Rosita Fornés
Rubén González
Grupo de Experimentación Sonora del ICAIC
Rey Guerra
Tata Güines
Adolfo Guzmán
Irakere
Enrique Jorrín
Los Latinos
Gina León
Pío Leyva
Farah María
Beatriz Márquez
Pablo Milanés
Grupo Moncada
Grupo Monumental
Fernando Mulens
NG La Banda
Noel Nicola
Jesús Ortega
Los Papines
Pello El Afrokán
Raúl Planas
Rodrigo Prats
Carlos Puebla
Elio Revé
Ritmo Oriental
Niño Rivera
Orquesta Riverside
Silvio Rodríguez
Ñico Rojas
Orquesta Antonio María Romeu
Gonzalo Rubalcaba
Conjunto Rumbavana
Eduardo Saborit
Arturo Sandoval
Senén Suárez
Juan Pablo Torres
Chucho Valdés
Merceditas Valdés
Los Van Van
Conjunto Yarey
Grupo Yoyi
Los Zafiros

See also

Panart
List of record labels

References

External links
 – official site

 
Record labels established in 1964
1964 establishments in Cuba
State-owned record labels